KRQK (100.3 FM, "La Ley") is a commercial radio station that is licensed to Lompoc, California, United States and serves the Santa Maria—Lompoc area. The station is owned by American General Media and broadcasts a regional Mexican music format.

History
KRQK was signed on December 18, 1979 at the 100.9 FM frequency by Sunshine Wireless of California, broadcasting a top 40 format. In 1985, Sunshine Wireless sold KRQK and its AM sister station KLLB (1410 AM) to Crystal Broadcasting Inc. for $1.75 million.

In January 1989, then-rock formatted KRQK applied to the Federal Communications Commission to change frequencies to 100.3 FM; the request was granted the following year. On December 22, 1989, Crystal Broadcasting sold KRQK and its AM counterpart, then known as KTME, to Nova Broadcasting-Santa Maria, headed by Gregg Peterson, for $1.47 million. The station pair changed hands once again in May 1993, when Nova Broadcasting sold the combo to Padre Serra Communications for $450,000. The new owner then flipped KRQK to a regional Mexican format.

In September 1999, Padre Serra sold KRQK to Bakersfield-based American General Media for $1.3 million.

On January 18, 2010 at 11:30 a.m., high winds in the Santa Maria area triggered a power outage that knocked several stations off the air, including KRQK. The station resumed broadcasting one hour later under generator power.

References

External links

RQK
Santa Barbara County, California
RQK
1979 establishments in California
Radio stations established in 1979